This article lists the discography of Derrick Drop Braxton.

Braxton, Derrick Drop